Alvin Biaño Garcia (born June 29, 1946) is a Filipino politician and lawyer who served twice as the Mayor of Cebu City from 1995 to 1998 and from 1998 to 2001. He served as the vice mayor of the said city from 1988 to 1995 alongside the mayor at the time: Tomas Osmeña. He is also the founder of Kugi Uswag Sugbo (KUSUG), a local political party based in Cebu City.

Early life and career
Garcia is the son of Jesus Paras Garcia and Severiana Biaño. His father is the brother of former Cebu Governor Pablo Paras Garcia making him the cousin of current governor Gwendolyn Garcia.

He was admitted to the Philippine Bar on March 10, 1971. He later founded the J.P. Garcia & Associates along with his brother, Jesus Jr.

Political career

Vice mayor, 1988–1995 
Garcia started his political career as vice mayor to Tomas Osmeña in 1988. Both served for two consecutive terms until Osmeña gave way to Garcia to run as mayor in the 1995 elections. He also served as president of the Vice Mayors' League of the Philippines from 1992 to 1995.

Mayor, 1995–2001 
He was first elected as mayor in 1995. He went on to serve for two terms until 2001 when he was defeated by Osmeña, his political mentor, who challenged him in the 2001 elections.

The defeat of the Bando Osmeña – Pundok Kauswagan (BO–PK) candidate in the local councilors league election started the rift between Garcia and Osmeña which was then followed by the latter's public criticisms.

Post-mayoral career 
In the 2004 elections, Garcia sought to reclaim his old post as mayor but was defeated again by then mayor Osmeña by almost 40,000 votes. He declined to run for the same position in the 2007 elections but ran in the 2010 elections after expressing confidence in the automated elections. He was once again defeated but this time by then vice mayor Michael Rama who was chosen by Osmeña to succeed him.

When Rama bolted Osmeña's BO–PK group in 2011 and sought re-election as mayor, Garcia and his group KUSUG endorsed him, Edgardo Labella as vice mayor, Annabelle Rama as 1st district representative and Aristotle Batuhan as 2nd district representative. Garcia's political group later allied itself with Team Rama (now Partido Barug), a political party formed by Rama.

Garcia ran for the position of representative of Cebu City's 1st district against incumbent Raul del Mar in the 2016 elections but was overwhelmingly defeated by more than 70,000 votes.

Controversies

F.E. Zuellig asphalt deal 
Garcia was embroiled in a controversy involving F.E. Zuellig, the Philippine distributor of asphalt brand Bitumex, after signing a contract that gave an advance payment to the said company for 600 metric tons of bitumen that was not delivered.

Fair Elections Act violation 
In 2006, criminal charges were filed against Garcia by the Commission on Elections for alleged violation of Section 6 of Republic Act No. 9006, otherwise known as the Fair Elections Act, after going over the allowable limit of political advertisement in a newspaper during the 2004 elections. This stemmed from the complaint filed by Osmeña pertaining to the political advertisements that ran in SunStar Cebu from April 26 to May 2, 2004.

Condominium project anomaly 
The Office of the Ombudsman in 2013 filed two counts of graft against Garcia for the alleged overpricing of the construction of a condominium project in 1997 when he was serving as mayor. The Sandiganbayan later dismissed the charges against Garcia and members of the Pre-qualification Bids and Awards Committee due to "inordinate delay" that "violated their constitutional right to speedy disposition of cases."

Personal life 
Garcia is married to Trinidad "Ninette" Neri Garcia. They have three children namely Jess Anthony, Jerald Mark and Raymond Alvin.

He also has a 5 percent share of SunStar Publishing, Inc., a media company based in Cebu City.

References 

|-

|-

1946 births
Living people
Cebuano people
Vice Mayors of Cebu City
Mayors of Cebu City
20th-century Filipino lawyers
Garcia family of Cebu